Ervatinine is an anti-corrosive indole alkaloid from Ervatamia coronaria (syn. Tabernaemontana divaricata).

See also 
 Ervaticine

References 

Indole alkaloids
Epoxides
Heterocyclic compounds with 5 rings
Lactams